Brigands, chapitre VII (internationally released as Brigands) is a 1996 French drama film written and directed by Otar Iosseliani. 

The film entered the competition at the 53rd Venice International Film Festival, where it received the Special Jury Prize.

Cast 
Amiran Amiranashvili as Vano
Davit Gogibedashvili as Sandro
Giorgi Tsintsadze as Spiridon
Nino Ordjonikidze as Eka
  Aleksi Jakeli as Viktor

References

External links

1996 films
French drama films
Films directed by Otar Iosseliani
Venice Grand Jury Prize winners
1990s French films